Karen Rolton Oval is a cricket ground in Adelaide, South Australia, named after the former Australian cricketer Karen Rolton. It is located near the corner of West Terrace and Port Road, opposite the new Royal Adelaide Hospital, in the eastern end of Park 25 of the Adelaide Park Lands.

The venue hosted a Women's One Day International (WODI) match between Australia and New Zealand on 24 February 2019. It hosted its first first-class match from 20 to 23 March 2019, when South Australia played Victoria in the final round of the 2018–19 Sheffield Shield season.

See also
 List of cricket grounds in Australia

References

Cricket grounds in Australia
Sport in Adelaide
Sports venues in Adelaide
Adelaide Park Lands